Dr John Vincent Yovich  (born 16 November 1959) is an Australian educator and veterinary doctor, and former Vice-Chancellor of Murdoch University, located in the suburb of Murdoch, Western Australia.

History
Professor Yovich earned a Bachelor of Veterinary Medicine and Surgery from Murdoch University in 1981. He also received a Diploma in Large Animal Medicine and Surgery from the University of Guelph from 1982 to 1983.

He went abroad and graduated with a Master of Science in 1986 and PhD in 1988 from Colorado State University. He also gained other professional qualifications from the American College of Veterinary Surgeons in 1987 and as a Registered Specialist in Veterinary Surgery and Equine Surgery.

He was the Vice-Chancellor of Murdoch University from 2002 to 2011.
Yovich was the head of the veterinary school of Murdoch University prior to his vice chancellor's role.

References

External links

1959 births
Living people
Australian veterinarians
Male veterinarians
Murdoch University Vice-Chancellors
Murdoch University alumni
Colorado State University alumni
Members of the Order of Australia